Zhou Mi (Chinese name: 周覓, born ) is a Chinese singer, songwriter, presenter, entertainer, radio personality, actor and author active in South Korea and China signed under SM and co-managed with Baymon for his china activities. He debuted in 2008 as an exclusive member of the Super Junior's china sub-group Super Junior-M and later participated in SM Entertainment's project group SM the Ballad. Aside from group activities, he also participates in various television variety shows, radio shows, and dramas. He release his first solo EP titled Rewind in 2014. In 2016, SM established own management for his activities in China, Zhoumi Studio.

Early life
Zhou Mi was born in Wuhan, Hubei province, China on 19 April 1986. As the only child of his family. He has been interested in music since childhood.

Career

2002–2007: Pre-debut
In 2002, Zhou Mi attended and won his first large-scale singing competition, MTV's Second Annual National Newcomer Singing Competition in 2002 at age 16. After winning the national championship, he was approached for a record deal but turned it down to continue his studies. This happened multiple times up until 2006.
He studied Broadcasting at Beijing Normal University Zhuhai Campus in Guangdong province.
In 2003, he won the title of Lively Star in the Wenquxing Star Ambassador Selection Competition. The contest earned him both a guest spot on Hunan TV's Happy Camp variety show and a spokesperson role for Wenquxing, an electronic dictionary maker.
At the Seventh Annual Shanghai Asian Music Festival Newcomer Singing Competition in 2004, Zhou Mi earned first place in the coastal region, as well as the National Newcomer Award. He continued to participate in multiple singing competitions in 2005, even after moving from Beijing to Zhuhai for college, in southern Guangdong Province. In 2005, he won four national championships and one regional championship, as well as a popularity contest at his university, Beijing Normal University at Zhuhai. He also was invited to sing at a Wang Leehom fanmeeting.

Zhou Mi made a name for himself in the Chinese entertainment scene by competing in competitions. In 2006, Zhou Mi joined CCTV's Challenging the Host, a televised national competition for aspiring MCs from all over China. As a representative of Guangzhou, Zhou Mi and 79 other contestants attended an offscreen training camp, learning about broadcasting from professionals and CCTV mentors. Zhou Mi proceeded to the next round easily during the 80 to 40 challenge (Guangzhou vs. Haarbin, aired May 25, 2006), and again during the 40 to 16 challenge aired July 30, 2006.
Before the final 16 could compete, Zhou Mi received an offer from SM Entertainment and decided to put his studies on hold in order to go to Korea, where he went in late 2006.

In 2007 Zhou Mi won the grand prize at the SM UCC Star Audition, although he didn't audition live, The auditions were conducted online from March 27 to early July 2007. His Korean friend, Kim Ki Hoon, signed him up to audition through the "Recommend a Friend" category, where he uploaded a video of Zhou Mi singing. he performed a song from Toy (토이) with the titled 내가 너의 곁에 잠시 살았다는걸 (That I was once by your side), and then he signed a contract with SM Entertainment and began his trainee career.

Zhou Mi was appeared as MC the showcase of Zhang Liyin , and a few months later, he debuted in China as a member of Super Junior-M.

2008–2009: Career beginnings

Zhou Mi debuted as the main vocalist of Super Junior-M in 2008.
They debuted in China at the 8th Annual Music Chart Awards, simultaneously with the release of their first music video, "U" on 8 April 2008. First studio album, Me was released on April 23, 2008.
Their album, debuted in Korea's MIAK Monthly Charts as #10  and reached #1 in China's Top in Music chart.
In this album he wrote three songs with titled "Love Song", "A Man in Love", and "Marry U".

Super Junior-M's first mini-album, Super Girl, was released on September 23, 2009.
In this album he wrote two songs with titled "Confession" and "You and Me". The mini-album won many awards and even earned the group a nomination for "Best Vocal Group" at the 21st Golden Melody Awards, the Chinese equivalent of the Grammy Awards.

2010-2012: Host-ing, comeback with Super Junior-M, and acting debut
In 2010 aside group activity Zhou Mi also hosting a Chinese show titled Korean Impression. This is a mainland travel-based show that focuses on Korea's latest news and cultural history. Each episode is aimed at having around 3 to 4 different themes which include things like the latest fashion products in Korea, Kpop idols, delicious Korean foods and dishes, and  Korea's unique culture and special attractions. Zhou Mi wrote three songs for Kangta Chinese EP Breaka Shaka in 2010, in this album he wrote the lead single "Breaka Shaka", "Remember", and "Many Times".

In February 2011, Zhou Mi acted in a supporting role in the Chinese drama Melody of Youth, which become his debut in that industry.
He also participated in the OST's on the ending theme song "Youth Melody" and featured other cast sang "Dandelion". Super Junior-M Second EP Perfection was released on February 23, 2011. In this album he wrote song with the titled "True Love". 
The album was one of the best-selling albums of 2011 in Taiwan. He joined Super Junior-M with Henry Lau for the single "Santa U Are The One" taken from SMTown's eighth winter album, 2011 Winter SMTown – The Warmest Gift, it was released in December 2011. Zhou Mi participated in the OST for Siwon and Donghae's Taiwanese drama series Skip Beat! on the track "Goodbye (不留紀念)", this song was released on December 11, 2011.

In 2012 Zhou Mi was cast as the main role in the idol drama When Love Walked In alongside label-mate Victoria Song, and Calvin Chen of the group Fahrenheit.
The drama premiered on August 27 on Anhui, Hubei, Shaanxi and Sichuan Satellite TV and reached the number one spot in viewership ratings.

2013-2014: Comeback group, SM The Ballad, and debut as soloist

Super Junior-M's second studio album, Break Down, was released on January 7, 2013, along with a lead single of the same name. The album includes three songs were written by himself with titled "Go", "It's You" and "Tunnel". The music for songs were composed by fellow Super Junior-M member Henry Lau and his team Noize Bank. Their Korean version of "Break Down" was released on January 31. On the same day, they made their official debut in Korea on Mnet's M! Countdown.
Malaysian singer and composer Michael Wong contributed to this album by composing a song for Zhou Mi, called "Distant Embrace", while the lyrics are written by Hong Kong singer and actress Crystal Cheung. The lyrics of "Distant Embrace" are about the faint pain of a love. On April 7, 2013, Zhou Mi released a travel scrapbook titled Thai Perfect which included his travel experience in Thailand.
Two versions of the book were released, one comes with a traditional Chinese and the other is simplified Chinese which released on December 5, 2013. On April, 2013, Zhou Mi was cast in the movie Rhythm of Rain (聽見下雨的聲音). He played as a big boy who has a bright personality and is very sincere. This movie directed by lyricist Vincent Fang. This movie was released on October 4, 2013. In 2013, Zhou Mi was chosen to be a radio DJ on MBC's C-Radio Idol True Colour with Miss A's member Jia and Fei. The program on the new media platform showcases content produced by the network and targets the large number of hallyu or Korean wave fans in China.
The network produces one episode each week, and the show is released to Chinese viewers on a Chinese video site such as Youku and Tudou, without going through a Chinese broadcasting station.

In February 2014, Zhou Mi became a new member of the ballad group SM The Ballad, initially formed in 2010. Zhou Mi participated in the group's 2nd album, Breath, performing the Chinese version of "Blind".
Zhou Mi performed his song at the S.M. The Ballad Joint Recital on February 12.
He also performed this song on Arirang's music program Simply K-Pop, MBC M's music program Show Champion, and SBS MTV's music program The Show. In March 2014, Super Junior-M's third mini album, Swing was released, The EP consists of six songs, which were released for digital download on March 21, 2014, in China and Taiwan by S.M. Entertainment. In this album Zhou Mi also contributing lyrics to their lead single, "Swing" and "Fly High". The group released the album in Korean music sites, such as MelOn, genie, Naver music and more, on March 31, 2014, and promoted on Korean music programs. In 2014, Zhou Mi was chosen to host the Korean-Chinese Variety Show titled Strongest Group with his labelmate Victoria Song. Zhou Mi then wrote the Chinese version of the track "Run" from Exo's second extended play Overdose. On October 22, 2014, Zhou Mi became an MC for season 4 of the SBS MTV's music program The Show with Park Ji-yeon (T-ara) and Hongbin (VIXX). His first solo EP Rewind was released on October 31, 2014. The Chinese version of the Rewind featured Tao and The Korean version was featured Chanyeol. All the tracklist in this album was written by himself.

2015–present: Variety show, comeback solo, and collaboration
Zhou Mi appeared as the Talk MC on the new season of fashion survival show
Fashion King - Secret Box, which premiered April 25, 2015, a survival show starring top Korean and Chinese celebrities.
In 2015, Zhou Mi was cast in the drama Best Couple alongside Lee Da-hae. This drama is set in the modern day Korean entertainment industry. It is the first TV production project from China's e-commerce company Alibaba. This drama aired in China in early 2016. and recorded more than 100 million views. Zhou Mi also participated in Super Junior special album, Devil was released to celebrate the group's 10th anniversary. He wrote lyric for "Forever with You" that was sung by Super Junior-M.

In early 2016, it was confirmed that Zhou Mi will be continuing to host the 5th season of SBS MTV The Show with new co-MC, GFriend's Yerin. He stepped down from his MC position on August 2 of that year, having hosted The Show for almost two years. 
Zhou Mi's second EP What's Your Number? was released on July 19, 2016.
He wrote the Chinese lyrics for a lead single "What's Your Number" and "Empty Room".

On April 19, 2018, Zhou Mi released a digital single titled "I Don't Care".
On the next day he hold a fan meeting  in Beijing, China to celebrated his birthday with his fans. On December 26, 2018, Zhou Mi released a single "The Lonely Flame" the track was written and composed by himself. The music video was directed by Shindong.

On May 6, 2019, Zhou Mi held a fan meeting in Tokyo, Japan, and the Japanese version of "The Lonely Flame" was released on the same day. On November 23, 2019, Zhou Mi participated in the music event dedicated to the 70th anniversary of China and sang "Sing a Folk Song for the Party".

In 2020, Zhou Mi collaborated with two members of WayV, Kun and Xiaojun, on the single "I'll be There" that was released on February 28, 2020. The track was written and composed by himself. "I'll be There" was a tribute song for the frontliners and those who are affected by COVID-19 especially to his hometown Wuhan, China. On June 22, 2020, Zhou Mi collaborated with fellow Super Junior-M member Ryeowook with new single "Starry Night". The Chinese version of the track was written and composed by himself.

On April 8, 2022, Zhou Mi signed an exclusive contract with Bymon Entertainment and will cooperate with SM Entertainment for his activity in China.

Discography

Extended plays
 Rewind (2014)
 What's Your Number? (2016)

Filmography

Bibliography

Scrapbook

Fan meeting

Awards and nominations

Notes

References

External links

 Zhou Mi's Official Website  

1986 births
Male actors from Wuhan
Chinese expatriates in South Korea
Chinese K-pop singers
Chinese Mandopop singers
Japanese-language singers of China
Korean-language singers of China
Living people
People from Wuhan
Mandarin-language singers
Mandopop singer-songwriters
Musicians from Wuhan
Singers from Hubei
SM Entertainment artists
SM Town
Super Junior-M members
Writers from Wuhan
Chinese male film actors
Chinese male television actors
21st-century Chinese male singers